Rocket Man is a BBC television drama series produced in 2005 by Philip Leach, about a recently widowed Welsh man who is struggling to build a rocket in which to launch his wife's ashes into space while raising his two children. It was created by Alison Hume, directed by Jon East (episodes 1 and 2), Jane Prowse (episodes 3 and 4) and James Strong (episodes 5 and 6), and stars Robson Green, Charles Dale, John Rhys Halliwell and Lucy Evans, with Alison Newman, Janine Wood, Kay Bridgeman, Kai Owen, Dave Hill, Philip Whitchurch and Marcus Smith in supporting roles, among others. The six hour-long episodes in the series were set in coastal Wales, in a town devastated by the closure of the local carriage works though filmed in Druridge Bay, Northumberland. According to the sign on the local chocolate bonbon factory appearing in Episode 1 where George, Barney, Diane et al. work, the exact location where the set is (fictional) Tonglas, in Newport.

Cast 
 Robson Green as George Stevenson, dyslexic widower and single parent
 Charles Dale as Barney Scott, George's best buddy and co-worker at the chocolate factory
 John Rhys Halliwell as Tom Stevenson, George's eight-year-old son
 Lucy Evans as Angela Stevenson, George's teenage daughter
 Kai Owen as David 'Shiner' Owen, security guard and another of George's mates
 Dave Hill as Huw Masters, another of George's friends
 Alison Newman as Diane Scott, Barney's wife
 Janine Wood as Mary Hughes, patent officer, former designer at the carriage works and George's love interest
 Philip Whitchurch as Lloyd Edwards, owner of the local scrapyard
 Kay Bridgeman as Pam Tomlyn, special needs co-ordinator / social worker at Tom's school
 Marcus Smith as Ed Fernandez, Angela's love interest
 Maureen Bennett as Barbara Masters, Huw's wife

References

External links 
 
 Rocket Man at BBC.

2005 British television series debuts
2005 British television series endings
2000s British comedy-drama television series
2000s British television miniseries
BBC television dramas
British comedy-drama television shows
English-language television shows
Television shows set in Wales
Television series by Banijay